The red rock crab, Guinusia chabrus, is a marine large-eyed crab of the family Plagusiidae. It is found in the southern Indian and southern Pacific Oceans, including South Africa, Australia, New Zealand, and Chile.

Description
A sturdy square bodied crab with a smooth dark red-brown carapace and yellow longitudinal ridges on the legs, yellow knobs on the pincers. There may be four white spots on the carapace in a roughly semicircular pattern.

Distribution
Southern Africa: Luderitz to Sodwana Bay, Subtidal to at least 100m.

Ecology
Common on reefs. Often seen in crevices or hiding under other benthic organisms. Scavenger.

With Haliotis midae it makes up the favoured diet of Octopus vulgaris in False Bay, South Africa.

References

External links

Closeup image on Flickr

Grapsoidea
Marine fauna of Southern Australia
Crustaceans of the eastern Pacific Ocean
Crustaceans described in 1758
Taxa named by Carl Linnaeus